Melaleuca depauperata is a shrub in the myrtle family, Myrtaceae and is endemic to the south-west of Western Australia. It has small, fleshy leaves and purple to pink flowers on short stalks along the branches.

Description 

The flowers are mauve, pink or violet in spikes of between 4 and 17 individual flowers which fade to white as they age. Flowering occurs from September to January but mainly between October and November.

Taxonomy and naming
This species was first formally described in 1852 by the Russian botanist Nikolai Turczaninow in Bulletin de la Classe physico-mathématique de l'Académie impériale des sciences de Saint-Pétersbourg. The specific epithet (depauperata) is from the Latin depauperatus, possibly referring to the type specimen having few flowers.

Distribution and habitat
Melaleuca depauperata occurs inland from the Stirling Range as far as Wagin and eastwards as far as Muntadgin and the Peak Charles National Park in the Avon Wheatbelt, Coolgardie, Esperance Plains and Mallee biogeographic regions. It grows on sandy and clayey soils on flats and roadsides.

Conservation status
Melaleuca depauperata is listed as "not threatened" by the Government of Western Australia Department of Parks and Wildlife.

References

depauperata
Myrtales of Australia
Rosids of Western Australia
Plants described in 1852
Endemic flora of Western Australia
Taxa named by Nikolai Turczaninow